Florence Township is one of the nine townships of Erie County, Ohio, United States.  It is part of the Sandusky, Ohio metropolitan statistical area. As of the 2010 census, the population was 2,448.

Geography
Located in the southeastern corner of the county, it borders the following townships:
Vermilion Township - north
Brownhelm Township, Lorain County - northeast corner
Henrietta Township, Lorain County - east
Wakeman Township, Huron County - south
Townsend Township, Huron County - southwest corner
Berlin Township - west

No municipalities are located in Florence Township, although the unincorporated community of Birmingham is located in the township's east.

Name and history
 Statewide, the only other Florence Township is located in Williams County.
 Florence Township was judicially independently organized in 1817. This township had been originally established about 1808 as "Jesup" Township, in honor of one of its original land-speculators; however, the township name was shortly later changed to "Florence" (due to that land-owner having fallen into disfavor with the pioneer-settlers who had purchased their farms from him).

Government
The township is governed by a three-member board of trustees, who are elected in November of odd-numbered years to a four-year term beginning on the following January 1. Two are elected in the year after the presidential election and one is elected in the year before it. There is also an elected township fiscal officer, who serves a four-year term beginning on April 1 of the year after the election, which is held in November of the year before the presidential election. Vacancies in the fiscal officership or on the board of trustees are filled by the remaining trustees.

References

External links
Florence Township official website
County website

Townships in Erie County, Ohio
Townships in Ohio